Lindfield East Public School, (abbreviation LEPS) is a school located in East Lindfield Sydney, Australia. It is a co-educational Public school operated by the New South Wales Department of Education and Training with students from years Kindergarten to 6. It is the local government school for the East Lindfield and East Killara suburbs.

Facilities
The school has somewhere between 30 & 40 classrooms on site. There is also a school library connected to 1 of the 2 computer education rooms, and an administration building.

School pledge
The school has a pledge to be said by students at fortnightly assemblies (During the coronavirus period these assemblies have had to stop as grades can not mingle): 
"In our hands lies the future of this great land. If we all work together, doing our best for the common good, there is no limit to what we can achieve."

Notable alumni

Steven Solomon (born 1993), Olympic sprinter
Jason Yeou (born 2004), Swimming National Gold Medalist
Karenza Horwood (born 1980's), Dentist
 List of Government schools in New South Wales

External links
 Lindfield East Public School website
 New South Wales Department of Education and Training School Locator – Lindfield East Public School

References

 

Public primary schools in Sydney
1929 establishments in Australia
Educational institutions established in 1929